is a railway station on the Shinetsu Main Line in the city of  Nagaoka, Niigata, Japan, operated by East Japan Railway Company (JR East).

Lines
Kita-Nagaoka Station is served by the Shinetsu Main Line and is 75.5 kilometers from the starting point of the line at Naoetsu Station.

Station layout
The station consists of one ground-level island platform connected to the station building by a footbridge, serving two tracks, located adjacent to the elevated Joetsu Shinkansen tracks. The station is unattended.

Platforms

History

It was renamed Kita-Nagaoka on 20 June 1951. With the privatization of Japanese National Railways (JNR) on 1 April 1987, the station came under the control of JR East. A new station building was completed in July 2014.

Surrounding area

See also
 List of railway stations in Japan

External links

 JR East station information 

Railway stations in Nagaoka, Niigata
Shin'etsu Main Line
Stations of East Japan Railway Company
Railway stations in Japan opened in 1915